Room for One More is an American sitcom, starring Andrew Duggan and Peggy McCay, which aired on ABC from January 27 until July 28, 1962.

Duggan and McCay played George and Anne Rose. The premise and humor came from their decision to augment their existing family with two adopted children. Actors playing the children included Tim Rooney, Ahna Capri, Carol Nicholson, and Ronnie Dapo. Jack Albertson played a neighbor, Walter Burton, with Maxine Stuart as his wife, Ruth Burton. Tommy Farrell played the character Fred in five episodes.

Room for One More and its contemporary, My Three Sons "were significant departures from the mom-and-pop model of the family" that typified American television comedy of its era. As with the similar Brady Bunch that would debut seven years later, the plots on Room for One More tended to feature "easily solvable situations".

Among the series guest stars were Parley Baer, Bob Hastings, Sandy Kenyon, Sue Ane Langdon, Robert Q. Lewis, Howard McNear, Maudie Prickett, and Gary Vinson.

Room for One More aired at 8:00 p.m. Eastern time on Saturday, having replaced another ABC/WB offering, The Roaring 20s.

The series was based on the 1952 film version, which starred Cary Grant and his wife Betsy Drake.

Cast

Andrew Duggan as George Rose
Peggy McCay as Anne Rose 
Tim Rooney as Jeff Rose
Carol Nicholson as Laurie Rose
Jack Albertson as Walter Burton
Maxine Stuart as Ruth Burton
Ronnie Dapo as Flip Rose 
Ahna Capri as Mary Rose

Episodes

External links

References

American Broadcasting Company original programming
1962 American television series debuts
1962 American television series endings
Television shows based on books
1960s American sitcoms
Television series by Warner Bros. Television Studios
Black-and-white American television shows
Television shows set in California
Live action television shows based on films
Television series about families
Television series about adoption